Utricularia unifolia is a medium-sized perennial carnivorous plant that belongs to the genus Utricularia. U. unifolia is native to Central America (Costa Rica, Nicaragua, and Panama) and western South America (Bolivia, Colombia, Ecuador, Peru, and Venezuela). It was originally published and described by Hipólito Ruiz López and José Antonio Pavón Jiménez in 1797 and later considered a synonym of Utricularia alpina until Peter Taylor's 1989 monograph on the genus where he restored the species as distinct from U. alpina. U. unifolia usually produces only one leaf (rarely two or three), which is where the species epithet "unifolia" is derived from.

See also 
 List of Utricularia species

References 

Carnivorous plants of Central America
Carnivorous plants of South America
Epiphytes
Flora of Bolivia
Flora of Brazil
Flora of Colombia
Flora of Costa Rica
Flora of Ecuador
Flora of Nicaragua
Flora of Panama
Flora of Peru
Flora of Venezuela
unifolia
Plants described in 1797